Speiredonia levis is a species of moth of the family Erebidae first described by Alberto Zilli and Jeremy Daniel Holloway in 2005. It is found on Timor in Maritime Southeast Asia.

The length of the forewings is 27.5 mm for males and 26 mm for females.

External links
 

Moths described in 2005
Speiredonia